Extremely Decent is a sketch comedy group from Los Angeles, California. They are known for their YouTube channel, where they post sketches and music videos. Popular uploads include The First Honest Cable Company, A Facebook Update in Real Life, and Gollum vs. Smeagol Rap Battle.

The group is made up of Mikey Caro, Jon Eidson, Ian McQuown, Brendan Rice, and Nick Smith.

References

External links 
 

Sketch comedy troupes
American comedy troupes
Organizations based in Los Angeles